Simocybe is a genus of fungi in the family Crepidotaceae. The genus is widely distributed, and contains 25 species.

Species
Simocybe atomacea
Simocybe austrorubi
Simocybe centunculus
Simocybe haustellaris
Simocybe luteomellea
Simocybe phlebophora
Simocybe pruinata
Simocybe reducta
Simocybe sumptuosa
Simocybe tabacina
Simocybe tiliophila
Simocybe unica

References

External links

Crepidotaceae